Baldwin Island is an island in Chemung County, New York. It is located north-northeast of Wellsburg, on the Chemung River.

References

River islands of New York (state)
Landforms of Chemung County, New York
Islands of New York (state)